The following is a list of episodes of Wait Till Your Father Gets Home.

Series overview

Episodes

Season 1 (1972–73)
The first 44 episodes (All episodes of the first two seasons) were directed by Peter Luschwitz.

Season 2 (1973-74)

Season 3 (1974)
All four episodes of the third and final season were directed by Charles A. Nichols.

External links
TV.com

Wait Till Your Father Gets Home
Wait Till Your Father Gets Home